Amalapuram is a city in the Indian state of Andhra Pradesh. It is the district headquarters and the largest town of Konaseema district. It is the mandal and divisional headquarters of Amalapuram mandal and Amalapuram revenue division respectively. The town is situated in the delta of konaseema.

History 
 

Amalapuram was originally named Amlipuri. Some of its temples are dedicated to Amaleswarudu.

Amalapuram is also called Panchalingapuram as it is the seat of five temples to Shiva as Amaleswarudu, Sidheswarudu, Ramalingeswarudu, Chandramouleeswarudu and Chennamalleeswarudu. Amalapuram is the most developed town in Dr. B.R. Ambedkar Konaseema district. It is hub of the district for education and financial institutes. There are approximately 65 schools and colleges, six engineering colleges and one medical college in the area. It is one among few parliament constituencies in India which do not have a railway connectivity.

Geography 
It is the largest town of Konaseema district.

Demographics 
 India census, Amalapuram has a population of 50,889 with 25,538 males and 25,351 females. Amalapuram has an average literacy rate of 77%, higher than the national average of 59.5%; 80.68% of males and 73.54% of females are literate. 77,036 people reside in rural parts of Amalapuram while 64,158 people reside in the Amalapuram urban area.

Governance

Politics 

Amalapuram is one of the 25 Lok Sabha constituencies in Andhra Pradesh.

Transport 

The Andhra Pradesh State Road Transport Corporation operates bus services from Amalapuram bus station. Regular buses between Rajahmundry, Kakinada non-stop, hourly based Vizag and Vijayawada from evening buses to Hyderabad available.

Education 
The primary and secondary school education is imparted by government, aided and private schools, under the School Education Department of the state. The medium of instruction followed by different schools are English and Telugu.

Notable people 
 Bayya Suryanarayana Murthy, former MP of Rajya Sabha, journalist, essayist, short-story writer
 G. M. C. Balayogi, former Lok Sabha Speaker
 Kala Venkata Rao, former Minister
 Devi Sri Prasad, Tollywood music composer and singer
 Ram Madhav, General Secretary, Bharatiya Janata Party
 Satwiksairaj Rankireddy, badminton player

References

External links 

 

Cities and towns in Konaseema district
Mandal headquarters in Konaseema district